Zardo Domenios (born 26 April 1984) is a Filipino diver. He competed in the men's 3 metre springboard event at the 2000 Summer Olympics.

References

External links
 

1984 births
Living people
Filipino male divers
Olympic divers of the Philippines
Divers at the 2000 Summer Olympics
Divers at the 2006 Asian Games
Divers at the 2010 Asian Games
Asian Games competitors for the Philippines